Nhim Vanda is a Cambodian politician. He belongs to the Cambodian People's Party and was elected to represent Prey Veng Province in the National Assembly of Cambodia in 2003.

Nhim Vanda is founder and owner of Kampot Zoo, established 1999.

References

Members of the National Assembly (Cambodia)
Cambodian People's Party politicians
Living people
Year of birth missing (living people)